Rádio Renascença, also known as 'RR' or just 'Renascença' (Renaissance in English), is a private, commercial radio station in Portugal, owned by various organizations within the Portuguese Catholic Church: among others, the Patriarchate of Lisbon. Founded in 1934, it began broadcasting in 1936. Renascença owns another three stations: RFM (the most listened-to radio station in the country), Mega Hits FM (most current hit charts), and Rádio Sim (a channel aimed at listeners over 55).

Some programs, notably newscasts and religious events, are broadcast simultaneously on both Rádio Renascença and Rádio Sim.

Rádio Renascença is available in mainland Portugal on FM. Rádio Sim is available on medium wave, covering most of mainland Portugal, as well as on FM in some regions.

RR (Rádio Sim)'s most powerful medium-wave transmitter – operating on a frequency of 594 kHz with a power of 100 kW (although currently using 60 to 80 kW) – is situated near the village of Muge, some 75 km north-east of Lisbon. It is a 259-meter-high guyed mast radiator and also Portugal's tallest structure.

History 
Founded by Monsignor Lopes da Cruz, trial broadcasts began in June 1936 with a transmitter installed in Lisbon. Regular broadcasting began on 1 January in the following.
A month after the start of daily broadcasts, the studios were ready at Rua Capelo and Radio Renascença settled there where it still remains.

Just after midnight on 25 April 1974 the station broadcast the banned song Grandola, Vila Morena as a signal to the revolutionary Armed Forces Movement (MFA) to commence operations against Portugal's authoritarian government in what became known as the Carnation Revolution: for this reason, the song later became famous as the anthem of the revolution.

In 1975 the radio station was occupied by workers, but in December of the same year it was returned to the Catholic Church and, unlike almost every other radio station in Portugal, Renascença was never nationalized.

In 1986 Radio Renascença began to air two distinct program schedules, 24 hours a day: from Radio Renascença (nationwide on MW and FM) and from RFM (nationwide on FM). More recently, in 1998, Mega FM was created in order to reach a younger target audience.

Frequencies 
 Lisboa - 103.4 MHz
 Porto - 93.7 MHz
 Lousã (Coimbra / Leiria / Aveiro) - 106.0 MHz
 Montejunto (Santarém / Leiria) - 90.2 MHz
 Arrábida (Setúbal) - 105.8 MHz
 Mendro (Évora/Beja) - 96.5 MHz
 Portalegre - 95.3 MHz
 Gardunha (Castelo Branco) - 103.4 MHz
 Guarda - 90.2 MHz
 Bragança - 105.7 MHz
 Bornes - 89.6 MHz
 Minhéu - 89.8 MHz
 Marofa - 94.2 MHz
 Muro (Viana do Castelo / Braga) - 103.4 MHz
 Faro - 103.8 MHz
 Fóia (Serra de Monchique) - 98.6 MHz
 Lamego (Vila Real) - 98.6 MHz
 Sintra - 105.0 MHz
 Serra d' Ossa (Évora) - 98.5 MHz
 São Miguel (Azores) - 95.2 MHz
 Madeira island - 88.0 MHz
 Valença - 100.0 MHz
 Vouzela - 93.8 MHz
 Aveiro - 102.5 MHz

See also 
 Radio Maria

References

External links 
 

Portuguese-language radio stations
Radio stations established in 1936
Radio stations in Portugal
1936 establishments in Portugal
Catholicism in Portugal
Catholic radio stations
Christian radio stations in Europe